Bunny Chow (also billed as Bunny Chow Know Thyself) is a South African comedy film by John Barker, partnered by MTV. It premiered on 7 September 2006 at the Toronto International Film Festival.

Synopsis 
Bunny Chow follows the weekend journey of four stand-up comedians, who embark on a road trip to Oppikoppi, South Africa's biggest annual rock festival. The four slip out of their normal lives for a few days with hopes of mass debauchery, drugs, rampant sex, true love and conquering the rock stages with their comedy, but they get a bit more than what they bargained for.

Cast
 David Kibuuka
 Kim Engelbrecht
 Kagiso Lediga
 Joey Yusuf Rasdien
 Jason Cope

Awards 
 Las Palmas de Gran Canaria 2007
 Sithengi 2006
 FCAT 2008

Release 
The movie was released March 21, 2008 in the United Kingdom and 19 May 2009 on DVD. The Movie has a score of 17% on Rotten Tomatoes. Although it had a Negative reception worldwide it had a positive one in South Africa.

References

External links
Bunny chow movie homepage (archived)

2006 films
2006 in South Africa
Films shot in South Africa
2006 comedy films
South African comedy films
2000s English-language films
English-language South African films